Max Band (21 August 1901 – 8 November 1974) was a Litvak landscape artist born in Kudirkos Naumiestis, Lithuania, a son of Abraham K. Band and Anna Tumpowsky.

He studied in Berlin and lived in Paris for much of his life. Band took up residence in California, United States in 1940 and was the father to director Albert Band, grandfather to filmmaker Charles Band and great-grandfather to singer/songwriter Alex Band. He died in Hollywood.

Aside from painting, Band wrote the art guide History of Contemporary Art (1935).

References

1901 births
1974 deaths
Landscape artists
Lithuanian artists
Lithuanian Jews
Lithuanian emigrants to the United States
French emigrants to the United States